Triplaris is a genus of plants in the family Polygonaceae. Ant tree is a common name for plants in this genus.

The species are variously distributed in the Americas. Some species are used for lumber. They are dioecious pioneer species.

Species and taxonomy
Species include:
Triplaris americana L. 	
Triplaris caracasana Cham. 	
Triplaris cumingiana Fisch. & C.A.Mey. 	
Triplaris dugandii Brandbyge 	
Triplaris fulva Huber 	
Triplaris gardneriana Wedd. 	
Triplaris melaenodendron (Bertol.) Standl. & Steyerm. 	
Triplaris moyobambensis Brandbyge 	
Triplaris peruviana Fisch. & Meyer ex C.A. Meyer 	
Triplaris punctata Standl. 	
Triplaris purdiae Meisn. 	
Triplaris purdiei Meisn. 	
Triplaris setosa Rusby 	
Triplaris vestita Rusby 	
Triplaris weigeltiana (Rchb.) Kuntze

References

Polygonaceae genera
Dioecious plants